Schubert is a lunar impact crater that lies near the eastern limb of the Moon's near side. It is located northwest of the Mare Smythii, and southwest of the prominent crater Neper. Nearly attached to the southern rim is the crater Back.

Schubert is a nearly circular crater formation that has not suffered significant erosion from subsequent impacts, and retains a well-defined rim. The interior surface is generally flat, with a few low hills near the center.

Satellite craters
By convention these features are identified on lunar maps by placing the letter on the side of the crater midpoint that is closest to Schubert.

The following craters have been renamed by the IAU.
 Schubert B — See Back (crater).
 Schubert Y — See Nobili (crater).
 Schubert Z — See Jenkins (crater).

Schubert C is called Doyle on some older maps, but this name was not approved by the IAU.

References

 
 
 
 
 
 
 
 
 
 
 
 

Impact craters on the Moon